Melrose is a neighborhood in Sayreville in Middlesex County, New Jersey, United States.

See also
List of neighborhoods in Sayreville, New Jersey

References

Neighborhoods in Sayreville, New Jersey